Empire State News is a news organization in New York State, which maintains a news website, 'Empire State News' newspaper and weather forecasting systems. Empire State News has operated since 2003, when production was begun by Statewide News Network, Inc, a three-decade old news broadcasting company for the Hudson Valley. It was sold on late 2015.

Notes

External links
 Empire State News

Newspapers published in New York (state)
Publications established in 2003